Centennial Trail may refer to:

 Black Hills Centennial Trail, South Dakota, United States
 Centennial Trail (Illinois), in Chicago
 North Idaho Centennial Trail, Idaho, United States
 Centennial Trail (Montana), in Helena
 Snohomish County Centennial Trail, Washington (U.S. state)
 Spokane River Centennial Trail, Washington (U.S. state)
 Centennial Trail (Manitoba), in Whiteshell Provincial Park

See also
 Centennial trail